Breath may refer to:

 Breathing, to inhale and exhale consecutively, drawing oxygen from the air, through the lungs.

Books
 Breathe, a 2005 novel by Penni Russon
 Breathe: A Ghost Story, a 2006 novel by Cliff McNish
 Breathe: Stories from Cuba, a 2016 short-story collection by Leila Segal
Breath: The New Science of a Lost Art, a 2020 popular science book by journalist James Nestor.

Film and television 
 Breathe (2009 film), a 2009 UK film
 Breathe, a 2011 film directed by J. Jesses Smith
 Breathe (2014 film), a 2014 French film
 Breathe, a 2015 film featuring Kristof Konrad
 Breathe (2017 film), a 2017 biographical drama film directed by Andy Serkis
 Breathe (2022 film), a Canadian film directed by Onur Karaman
 "Breathe" (Better Call Saul), a 2018 episode of Better Call Saul
 Breathe (Web series), a 2018 Indian Web series
Breathe: Into the Shadows (Web Series), a 2020 Indian Web Series

Law
BREATHE Act, a U.S. bill proposed in 2020

Music

Bands 
 Breathe (Australian band), Australia, 2010s
 Breathe (British band), United Kingdom, 1980s
 Breathe (New Zealand band), New Zealand, 1990s

Albums 
 Breathe (Edmond Leung album), 1996
 Breathe (Faith Hill album), 1999
 Breathe (Keller Williams album), 1999
 Breathe, by Midge Ure, 1996
 Breathe (Midnight Oil album), 1996
 Breathe (Mike Peters album), 1994
 Breathe (Pandora album), 1999
 Breathe (Psychic TV album), 1996
 Breathe (Through Fire album), 2016

EPs 
 Breathe (Birdy EP), by Birdy, 2013
 Breathe, by Diamond Cafe, 2017
 Breathe (Maverick City Music EP), 2022

Songs
Breathe (song), an alphabetical list according to artist or band 

 "Breathe" by Alexi Murdoch, from the album Time Without Consequence
 "Breathe" by Alter Bridge, a B-side song
 "Breathe" by Angels & Airwaves, from the album I-Empire
 "Breathe (2 AM)" by Anna Nalick, from the album Wreck of the Day
 "Breathe" by Backstreet Boys, from the album In a World Like This
 "Breathe" by Backstreet Boys, from the album DNA
 "Breathe" by Basement, from the album Colourmeinkindness
 "Breathe" by Bethel Music featuring Amanda Cook, from the album Starlight
 "Breathe" (Blu Cantrell song) by Blu Cantrell featuring Sean Paul, from the album Bittersweet
 "Breathe" by BoDeans, from the album Still
 "Breathe" by Bon Jovi, from the album 100,000,000 Bon Jovi Fans Can't Be Wrong
 "Breathe" (CamelPhat and Cristoph song) by CamelPhat and Christoph featuring Jem Cooke
 "Breathe" by Collective Soul, from the album Hints Allegations and Things Left Unsaid
 "Breathe" by The Cult, from the album Beyond Good and Evil
 "Breathe" (Delilah song) by Delilah, from the album From the Roots Up
 "Breathe" by Depeche Mode, from the album Exciter
 "Breathe" by Dev, from the album The Night the Sun Came Up
 "Breathe" by Diamond Cafe, from the album Breathe
 "Breathe" by Disturbed, from the album Believe
 "Breathe" (Erasure song) by Erasure, from the album Nightbird
 "Breathe" by Eric Prydz, from the album Opus
 "Breathe" (Fabolous song) by Fabolous, from the album Real Talk
 "Breathe" (Faith Hill song) by Faith Hill, from the album Breathe
 "Breathe" by G-Dragon, from the album Heartbreaker
 "Breathe" (Jax Jones song) by Jax Jones featuring Ina Wroldsen, from the EP Snacks and the album Snacks (Supersize)
 "Breathe" (Kaz James song) by Kaz James featuring Stu Stone, from the album If They Knew
 "Breathe" by Kittie, from the album Funeral for Yesterday
 "Breathe" (Kylie Minogue song) by Kylie Minogue, from the album Impossible Princess
 "Breathe" by Lalah Hathaway, from the album Self Portrait
 "Breathe" by Luna Sea, from the album Shine
 "Breathe" (Maverick City Music song), by Maverick City Music featuring Jonathan McReynolds and Doe, from the album Jubilee: Juneteenth Edition
 "Breathe" by Melissa Etheridge, from the album Lucky
 "Breathe" by Michael W. Smith, from the album Worship
 "Breathe" (Michelle Branch song) by Michelle Branch, from the album Hotel Paper
 "Breathe" (Midge Ure song) by Midge Ure, from the album Breathe
 "Breathe" by Ministry, from the album The Mind Is a Terrible Thing to Taste
 "Breathe" by Miss A, from the album A Class
 "Breathe" (Moist song) by Moist, from the album Mercedes 5 and Dime
 "Breathe" by Newsboys, from the album Take Me to Your Leader
 "Breathe" (Nickelback song) by Nickelback, from the album The State
 "Breathe", by Nonpoint from the album Vengeance, 2007
 "Breathe" by Paramore, an unreleased song
 "Breathe" (Pink Floyd song) by Pink Floyd, from the album The Dark Side of the Moon
 "Breathe (Reprise)" by Pink Floyd, a snippet in the song "Time", also on The Dark Side of the Moon
 "Breathe" (The Prodigy song) by The Prodigy, from the album The Fat of the Land
 "Breathe" by Rebecca St. James, from the album Worship God
 "Breathe" (Ricki-Lee Coulter song) by Ricki-Lee Coulter, from the album Ricki-Lee
 "Breathe" by Roger Waters, from the album Music from the Body
 "Breathe" by Roxette, from the album The Ballad Hits
 "Breathe" by Ryan Star, from the album 11:59
 "Breathe" (Seeb song) by SeeB featuring Neev
 "Breathe" by Sugar Ray, from the album Floored
 "Breathe" by Swollen Members featuring Nelly Furtado, from the album Monsters in the Closet
 "Breathe" by Taproot, from the album Welcome
 "Breathe" by Tara Blaise, from the album Great Escape
 "Breathe" (Taylor Swift song) by Taylor Swift featuring Colbie Caillat, from the album Fearless
 "Breathe" (Télépopmusik song) by Télépopmusik featuring Angela McCluskey, from the album Genetic World
 "Breathe" by Toploader, from the album Onka's Big Moka
 "Breathe" by Two of Cups, used in the TV series Ugly Betty
 "Breathe" (U2 song) by U2, from the album No Line on the Horizon
 "Breathe" (Winterville song) by Winterville, from the album Everything in Moderation
 "Breathe (Respira)" from the musical In the Heights
 "Breathe" by Lenny Kravitz

See also
"Breathe and Stop", a song by Q-Tip, from the album Amplified, 1999
Breath (disambiguation)
Breathing (disambiguation)
Breathe Again (disambiguation)
Exhale (disambiguation)